Crystalized Movements were an American psychedelic rock/punk/folk band who recorded and performed sporadically from 1980 to 1993.

History
The band was formed by guitarist Wayne Rogers and drummer Ed Boyden in Tolland, Connecticut when they were high school freshmen. Rogers and Boyden were brought together by a love of late 1970s No Wave music and 1960s psychedelia. After years of improvisational experimentation, they decided to make an LP in 1983 and recorded duo versions of some of Wayne's songs. They then split up upon graduating high school. Rogers, a longtime fan of the Plastic Cloud and Randy Holden, spent a summer piling on mountains of guitar overdubs. The resulting 'basement prog' album Mind Disaster, with Scott McLeod on vocals, was released at the end of that year in an edition of 130 (on Rogers' own record label, Twisted Village). After being discovered by record collectors, the album was reissued on Psycho in the UK in 1984.

Rogers put a full band together in 1985 before recording the next album: Dog... Tree... Satellite Seers, a scathing rebuke to "faux-lysergic posers". Guitarist Kate Biggar joined in 1988 upon Arn's departure (to southern California where he formed Primordial Undermind), cementing the band's final lineup on the next album This Wideness Comes.

The 1992 album Revelations From Pandemonium, on which Rogers and Biggar were joined by McLeod on bass and Teri Morris on drums, proved to be Crystalized Movements' finale. The album received a three-star review from the Chicago Tribune, with Peter Margasak describing the band as "at the brink of becoming unhinged and jumping into a great abyss of no-holds-barred psychedelia".

Following the demise of the band, the Rogers/Biggar duo, who had also recorded as Vermonster during their time in Crystalized Movements, have continued on in critically acclaimed groups such as B.O.R.B., Magic Hour (with Damon and Naomi of Galaxie 500) and the Major Stars, Rogers also releasing four solo albums in the 1990s.

Rogers and Biggar married in the early 1990s.

Discography

Albums
Mind Disaster (1983), Twisted Village
Dog... Tree... Satellite Seers (1987), Twisted Village
This Wideness Comes (1989), Twisted Village
Revelations From Pandemonium (1992), Twisted Village

Compilations
Damaged Lights - Early Recordings 1980-1983 (1991), Twisted Village

Singles
"Blown Over" (1991), Twisted Village
"The Lowest Step" (1991), No. 6

References

American punk rock groups
American folk rock groups
Musical groups established in 1980
Musical groups disestablished in 1993